Pang Zhiquan (born 16 August 1990 in Qingdao) is a Chinese footballer who currently plays for Shaanxi Chang'an Athletic in the China League One.

Club career
Pang Zhiquan started his professional football career in 2009 when he joined Qingdao Jonoon for the 2009 Chinese Super League campaign. On 3 May 2010, he made his debut for Qingdao Jonoon in the 2010 Chinese Super League against Beijing Guoan, coming on as a substitute for Aleksander Rodić in the 88th minute.

In March 2014, Pang transferred to China League Two side Guizhou Zhicheng.
On 13 July 2018, Pang transferred to Shaanxi Chang'an Athletic.

Career statistics 
Statistics accurate as of match played 31 December 2020.

References

External links

1990 births
Living people
Chinese footballers
Footballers from Shandong
Qingdao Hainiu F.C. (1990) players
Guizhou F.C. players
Shaanxi Chang'an Athletic F.C. players
Chinese Super League players
China League One players
China League Two players
Association football forwards